Hemitaurichthys zoster, commonly known as the brown-and-white butterflyfish, black pyramid butterflyfish, zoster butterflyfish, or brushtooth butterflyfish, is a marine ray-finned fish, a butterflyfish belonging to the family Chaetodontidae native to the Indian Ocean.

Description
The black pyramid butterflyfish is a small-sized fish that can reach a maximum length of 18 cm.

Its body is compressed laterally with a rounded body profile. The snout is somewhat stretched with a small terminal protractile mouth. The body is black, crossed in its center by a broad white trapezoid band with a yellow top, corresponding to the center of the dorsal fin. The caudal fin is white.

Distribution & ecology
Hemitaurichthys zoster is widespread throughout tropical and subtropical waters of the Indian Ocean from the eastern coast of Africa to Java in Indonesia and from India to Mauritius.
It lives in large schools on outer reef slopes, from which it can sally into open water to feed on plankton. The species is found at depths of 3–40 meters.

Taxonomy and etymology
Hemitaurichthys zoster was first formally described as Chaetodon zoster in 1831 by the English zoologist Edward Turner Bennett (1797–1837) with the type locality given as Mauritius. The specific name zoster means "belt" or "girdle" and is presumed to refer to the wide , white band in the middle of this fish's body.

Utilisation
Hemitaurichthys zoster is rare in the aquarium trade.

Conservation status
Hemitaurichthys zoster is a planktivore, and the species may be affected by climate-induced reductions in planktonic productivity. As there do not appear to be any specific current threats, it is listed as Least Concern (LC) by the IUCN.

References

External links
 

zoster
Fish of the Indian Ocean
Fish described in 1831
Taxa named by Edward Turner Bennett